WBBF (1120 kHz, "98.9 The Vibe") is a commercial AM radio station in Buffalo, New York. It airs a classic hip hop radio format and is owned by Cumulus Media.  The studios and offices are on James E. Casey Drive in Buffalo.

WBBF broadcasts with a power of 1,000 watts as a daytimer. Its transmitter is on Dorrance Avenue at Onondaga Avenue in West Seneca, New York. AM 1120 is reserved for Class A, clear channel station KMOX in St. Louis, so WBBF must leave the air at night to avoid interference. WBBF programming is heard around the clock on FM translator W255DH on 98.9 MHz.

History

WWOL, WHTT, WMNY
The station signed on in 1947 as WWOL. In 1954, its FM counterpart WWOL-FM (now WHTT-FM) signed on, simulcasting AM 1120. In the 1970s, WWOL-AM-FM aired a country music format, later switching to oldies as WHTT and WHTT-FM.  

In the 1990s, AM 1190 broke away from its simulcast with WHTT-FM. The AM station was sold to Mercury Communications and changed its format to a brokered programming business format.  It began using the call sign WMNY which represented the word MoNeY.

Switch to WBBF
The WBBF call letters were used on several radio stations in nearby Rochester for over fifty years, including stations now known as WROC, WBZA and most recently, WFKL, which dropped the call sign in early 2005. Then-WMNY picked up the WBBF calls shortly thereafter.

The station had been a part of the Totally Gospel Radio Network from September 1996 until December 2006. The network moved to a stronger 24-hour signal in Western New York on sister station 1270 WHLD as well as other stations across the U.S., including FM station WFWO in 2010.

Spanish-language Christian
In 2007, a Spanish-language Christian music and talk station was launched by Totally Gospel Radio Network. All of the Spanish-language programming on WBBF which was initially produced by the Totally Gospel Radio Network was sold to Assemblia Iglesia, a local Hispanic ministry headed by Pastor Sam Rivera.

When Cumulus Media switched 1270 WHLD from adult standards to CBS Sports Radio early in 2013, the company planned to move the former WHLD format to WBBF, but people in the Spanish speaking community wrote to Cumulus about the station's value to Western New York Latinos. The ministry's programming remained.

The original Totally Gospel Radio Network format returned to the airwaves on WBBF in January 2016 during drive times, along with a blend of Urban Gospel and Hispanic Christian programming throughout the week. Totally Gospel Network returned as the primary format on WBBF as of September 2017.

WBBF went silent on July 16, 2019, and resumed broadcasting December 20. For the following 14 months, the station resumed simulcasting WHTT-FM as temporary programming, identifying itself as WBBF only in station identification.

Classic Hip Hop
On February 27, 2021, WBBF dropped its simulcast with WHTT and changed the format to classic hip hop, branded as "98.9 The Vibe", with programming sourced from the co-owned Westwood One Radio Network. The 98.9 FM translator indirectly reunites the WBBF call letters with one of the frequencies it used during its time on Rochester radio.

WBBF is one of two Buffalo AM stations, along with 1400 WWWS, offering programming for the African-American community.  WBBF and WWWS both have FM translators and use the FM dial position to identify themselves.  They compete with full-power FM station 93.7 WBLK,  which has an urban contemporary format.

Previous logo

References

External links

FCC History Cards for WBBF

1947 establishments in New York (state)
Radio stations established in 1947
BBF
Cumulus Media radio stations
BBF
Classic hip hop radio stations in the United States